Diego Luis Albanese (born September 17, 1973, in Mar del Plata) is a former Argentine rugby union player who played as a winger. He played for the San Isidro Club in Argentina, French side Grenoble, Gloucester and Leeds Tykes. Albanese made 17 appearances for Gloucester scoring three tries.

He has won 55 caps for Argentina, scoring 50 points, including appearances at the 1995, 1999 and 2003 World Cups. He became famous after scoring the winning try in the World Cup wild card match against Ireland in the 1999 World Cup that put Argentina into their first-ever quarter final.

Albanese joined Leeds Tykes in 2002 on a two-year contract. He made his debut against Leicester Tigers in August 2002 and helped his new side to a 26–13 win. In his first season 2002–2003 Diego made 18 starts in the Zurich Premiership scoring one try, a match winner against Harlequins at Headingley. After returning from the World Cup in 2003, he went on to make eight more starts in the Zurich Premiership scoring one try, Diego was also a try scorer for Leeds Tykes in the Heineken Cup, in the loss to the reigning European Champions Toulouse at Headingley. During his time at Leeds he helped them win the 2004–05 Powergen Cup, for the final of which he was an early replacement for Iain Balshaw.

Albanese left the Tykes at the end of the 2004/05 season to return to SIC in Argentina, where he retired in 2006.

Honours
Powergen Cup/Anglo-Welsh Cup titles: 1
2005

References

External links
 
 

1973 births
Sportspeople from Mar del Plata
Argentine rugby union players
Rugby union wings
Living people
San Isidro Club rugby union players
Gloucester Rugby players
Leeds Tykes players
Argentina international rugby union players
Argentine expatriate rugby union players
FC Grenoble players
Expatriate rugby union players in France
Expatriate rugby union players in England
Argentine expatriate sportspeople in France
Argentine expatriate sportspeople in England
Argentina international rugby sevens players
Male rugby sevens players